Kaoru Mende (born 1950 in Tokyo, Japan) is an architectural lighting designer from Japan.

Mende has bachelor's and master's degrees from the Tokyo University of Art. He is a visiting professor of lighting design at Musashino Art University and also lectures at Tokyo University of the Arts, among other institutions.

Kaoru Mende is the CEO of Lighting Planners Associates. He is a member of the Illuminating Engineering Society (IES, formerly IESNA) and the International Association of Lighting Designers (IALD).

Mende is also the acting chief of the "Lighting Detectives", a citizens' group that specializes in the study of the culture of lighting. Mende has been involved in such superb projects as Tokyo International Forum, JR Kyoto Station, Sendai Mediatheque, Roppongi Hills, National Museum of Singapore, Singapore City Center Lighting Master Plan, Alila Villas Uluwatu, Aman New Delhi, Gardens by the Bay and Façade lighting for Tokyo station.

Awards

2007 
 Chino Cultural Complex – Radiance Award for Excellence in Lighting Design, IALD International Lighting Design Awards 
 Changi Airport Redesign – Award of Merit, IALD International Lighting Design Awards

2006 
 One George Street – IESNA Award of Excellence
 Hiroshima City Naka Incineration Plant – IALD Award of Excellence
 Kyoto State Guest House – IESNA Award of Merit
 Kyoto State Guest House – IALD Award of Merit

2005 
 Shiodome Sumitomo Building – IESNA Award of Merit 
 W Seoul Walkerhill  – IESNA Award of Merit

2004 
 Kani Public Arts Center – IESNA Award of Merit 
 Shiodome City Center & Block B Common Use Area – IESNA Award of Merit
 Nagasaki National Peace Memorial for the Atomic Bomb Victims – Japan Lighting Award

2003 
 Oasis 21 – IESNA Award of Distinction
 Sendai Mediatheque – IALD Honorable Mention

2002 
 Iwate Museum of Art – IESNA Award of Merit
 Osaka Maritime Museum  – IESNA Award of Merit 
 National Museum of Emerging Science & Innovation – IESNA Award of Merit

1997 
 Tokyo International Forum – IALD Award of Excellence

1996 
 Symbol Promenade Water Front Sub Center – IESNA Award of Merit 
 Shinjuku Island Tower – IESNA Award of Merit 
 Osaka World Trade Center – IESNA Award of Merit 
 Kyoto Concert Hall – IESNA Award of Merit 
 CASA – IESNA Award of Merit

1995 
 Toyonokuni Library for Resources – IESNA Award of Excellence 
 Beppu Park – IESNA Award of Merit 
 NTT CRED Motomachi Building – IESNA Award of Merit 
 Tokyo Marine Insurance Seminar Center – IESNA Award of Merit 
 National Yokohama International Conference Hall – IESNA Award of Merit

1994 
 Toyota Amlux Osaka – IESNA Award of Merit 
 Izumigo Plaza Hotel, Tateshina – IESNA Award of Merit 
 Panasonic Data & Communication Center – IESNA Edwin F. Guth Memorial Special Citation

1985 
 Japan Garden Light – IESNA Award of Excellence

References 

1950 births
Japanese interior designers
Lighting engineers
Lighting designers
Living people
People from Tokyo
University of Tokyo alumni